Víctor Andrés Andrés (born 21 October 1988 in Soria, Castile and León) is a Spanish footballer who plays for CD Calahorra as a midfielder.

References

External links

1988 births
Living people
People from Soria
Sportspeople from the Province of Soria
Spanish footballers
Footballers from Castile and León
Association football midfielders
Segunda División players
Segunda División B players
Tercera División players
Real Valladolid Promesas players
CD Numancia B players
CD Numancia players
UD Salamanca players
Cultural Leonesa footballers
Atlético Astorga FC players
Real Jaén footballers
CF Talavera de la Reina players
CD Ebro players
CD Calahorra players